Westhaven is an unincorporated community in Fresno County, California.

A post office operated at Westhaven from 1918 to 1958.

During World War II was the site of a training landing strip called Boston Field, part of Lemoore Army Air Field.

References

Unincorporated communities in California
Unincorporated communities in Fresno County, California